Margarete von Bayern (1480–1531) was a German abbess who was the daughter of George, Duke of Bavaria.

She served as the abbess of Benediktinerinnenkloster in Neuburg an der Donau from 1509 to 1521.

References 

German Roman Catholic abbesses
House of Wittelsbach
1480 births
1531 deaths